This is a list of Sites of Community Importance by country.

 List of Sites of Community Importance in Cyprus
 List of Sites of Community Importance in France
 List of Sites of Community Importance in Greece
 List of Sites of Community Importance in Italia
 List of Sites of Community Importance in Portugal
 List of Sites of Community Importance in Spain

See also 
 Natura 2000

References 
 List of Sites of Community Importance for several Mediterranean countries

Sites of Community Importance